Melitaea phoebe, the knapweed fritillary, is a butterfly of the family Nymphalidae. It is found in the Palearctic realm, except the northernmost locations. It used to include Melitaea telona, recently revalidated as a distinct cryptic species.

Description 
The wingspan is 34–50 mm. M. phoebe. The largest Melitaea of the Old World, at least certain of its forms. The forewing much more pointed than in the previous species; equally variable in colour as well as the distinctness of the markings. The black markings are usually united, in some cases even covering nearly the whole wings, but in other cases may be strongly reduced. It is characteristic for this species that the reddish yellow submarginal lunate spot situated between the two median veins reaches with its vertex considerably farther into the disc than the other yellow lunate spots. This is especially the case on the forewing, but also on the hindwing the submarginal lunule between the 1. and 2. median veins projects farther basad than the others of the same row.

Biology 
The butterfly flies from April to September depending on the location.
The larvae feed on Plantago and Centaurea species (including Centaurea jacea).

References 

phoebe
Butterflies of Europe